Leslie Kaplan (born 1943) is an American-born French writer.

She was born in New York City and grew up in Paris. She studied philosophy, history and psychology and then worked for two years in a factory. Kaplan took part in the events of May 1968. She published her first book in 1982 L'Excès-l'usine, which received favourable comments from authors Marguerite Duras and Maurice Blanchot.

Awards
In 2017, she received a prize from the Société des gens de lettres recognizing her work.

Works 
 L'Excès - l'usine (1982)
 Le Livre des ciels (1983)
 Le Criminel (1985)
 Le Pont de Brooklyn (1987)
 L'Epreuve du passeur (1988)
 Le Silence du diable (1989)
 Les Mines de sel (1993)
 Depuis maintenant, Miss Nobody Knows (1996)
 Les Prostituées philosophes (1997)
 Le Psychanalyste (1999)
 Les Amants de Marie (2002)
 Les Outils (2003) 
 Fever (2005)
 Toute ma vie j'ai été une femme (2008)
 Mon Amérique commence en Pologne (2009) 
 Louise, elle est folle (2011) 
 Millefeuille (2012) received the Prix Wepler
 Déplace le ciel (2013) 
 Mathias et la Révolution (2016)

References 

1943 births
Living people
20th-century French writers
20th-century French women writers
21st-century French writers
21st-century French women writers
Writers from New York City
American emigrants to France